Giovanna Nocetti (born 10 March 1945), known mononymously as Giovanna, is an Italian singer, record producer and songwriter, mainly successful in the 1970s.

Life and career 
Born in Viareggio, Giovanna started playing the guitar during her high school years, and after a year at the university she eventually decided to abandon her studies and to move to Milan to pursue a music career. In 1967, she signed a contract with the label , and the same year she recorded her first single, "Ricordi notturni", composed by her own.

Giovanna became first known in 1970, thanks to her participation to the RAI musical show Settevoci, and the same year she got her first hit, "Io non volevo dimenticare". In 1971 she released her first album, Una corsa pazza. In the late 1970s she passed to the label Ri-Fi, getting her major hit with the song "Il mio ex", written by Paolo Limiti and Roberto Carlos.

In 1982 Giovanna founded her own label, Kicco Records. In 1985 she composed a musical version of Ave Maria, which she also performed at the Sala Nervi in Vatican City in the presence of Pope John Paul II.
 
From the mid-1980s Giovanna focused her activity both as a singer and as a producer on rediscovering and reworking Italian classic songs.

Discography
Album
 
     1971: Una corsa pazza
     1973: Ho passato un brutto inverno
     1975: Una storia quasi vera
     1980: Giò
     1982: Giovanna
     1983: Macchie d'amore
     1984: ’Na sera 'e maggio
     1985: Tentazioni
     1987: La voce dell'amore
     1990: Giò
     1991: L'amante mia
     1991: Vecchio frak
     1993: Noi, fra un tango e una canzone
     1994: Lega l'amore
     1994: Giò - La donna che amo
     1997: Giovanna canta Nino Rota
     1999: Songs e melodies
     2000: Le canzoni di Paolo Limiti
     2008: The best of my life
     2010: Il mio ex - Le canzoni di Paolo Limiti vol. 2

References

External links

1945 births
People from Viareggio
Italian pop singers
Italian women singer-songwriters
Italian singer-songwriters
Living people
Italian record producers
Italian women record producers